Sainte-Geneviève-des-Bois is a commune in the Loiret department in north-central France.

Geography

The villages lies in the middle of the commune, on the right bank of the Talot, which forms part of the commune's northern border, then flows into the Loing, which forms the commune's eastern border.

See also
Communes of the Loiret department

References

Saintegenevievedesbois